An official script is a writing system that is specifically designated to be official in the constitutions or other applicable laws of countries, states, and other jurisdictions. Akin to an official language, an official script is much rarer. It is used primarily where an official language is in practice written with two or more scripts. As, in these languages, use of script often has cultural or political connotations, proclamation of an official script is sometimes criticized as having a goal of influencing culture or politics or both. Desired effects also may include easing education, communication and some other aspects of life.

List of official scripts 
Below is a partial list of official scripts used in different countries. Those in italics are states that have limited international recognition.

Azerbaijan – Azeri Latin alphabet
Bangladesh – Bengali script
Brunei – Rumi script (Latin) and Jawi script (Arabic)
Bosnia and Herzegovina:
Republika Srpska – Cyrillic and Latin
Federation of Bosnia and Herzegovina – Cyrillic and Latin
Cambodia – Khmer script
China, People's Republic of (mainland China) – Simplified Chinese
Hong Kong SAR – Traditional Chinese (de facto), Latin script
Macau SAR – Traditional Chinese (de facto), Latin script
Inner Mongolia region – Mongolian alphabet, Simplified Chinese
Tibet region – Tibetan alphabet, Simplified Chinese
Xinjiang region – Uyghur Ereb Yéziqi, Simplified Chinese
Guangxi region – Zhuang Latin alphabet, Simplified Chinese
Croatia – Croatian alphabet
Ethiopia – Ge'ez script
Eritrea – Ge'ez script
Georgia – Georgian alphabet
Greece - Greek alphabet
India:
Hindi, Marathi, Konkani, Nepali, Maithili, Boro, Sanskrit, Dogri – Devanagari
Assamese – Assamese alphabet
Bengali – Bengali alphabet
Gujarati – Gujarati script
Kannada – Kannada script
Kashmiri – Perso-Arabic script
Malayalam – Malayalam script
Meitei – Meitei Mayek script
Odia – Odia script
Punjabi – Gurmukhi
Santali – Ol Chiki script
Sindhi – Perso-Arabic script, Devanagari
Tamil – Tamil script
Telugu – Telugu script
Urdu – Perso-Arabic script
Indonesia – Rumi script (Latin)
Iran – Perso-Arabic alphabet
Japan – mixed of Kana (Hiragana, Katakana) and Kanji (Shinjitai)
Kazakhstan – Cyrillic (Kazakh, Russian) and Latin (Kazakh)
Korea (both) – Chosŏn'gŭl/Hangul (Hanja is sometime used in South Korea, not used in North Korea)
Laos – Lao script
Malaysia – Rumi script (Latin); Jawi script (Arabic) is recognized.
Maldives – Thaana
Moldova – Latin alphabet
Mongolia – Mongolian Cyrillic alphabet and Mongolian script
Montenegro – Cyrillic and Gaj's Latin script
Myanmar – Burmese alphabet
Nepal
Nepali language — Devanagari
Nepal Bhasa — Ranjana script
Maithili — Tirhuta and Kaithi
Bhojpuri — Kaithi and Devanagari
Magar — Magar Akkha and Devanagari
Tharu — Devanagari
Tamang — Tamyig, Devanagari and Tibetan script
Bajjika — Tirhuta, Kaithi and Devanagari
Limbu — Limbu script
Bantawa — Kirat Rai script and Devanagari
Gurung — Khema script, Devanagari and Tibetan script
Awadhi — Kaithi, Perso-Arabic, Devanagari and Latin-Roman
Urdu — Perso-Arabic, Roman Urdu and Urdu Braille
North Macedonia – Cyrillic (Macedonian alphabet)
Philippines – Latin alphabet (de facto)
Russian Federation – Cyrillic (Russian alphabet)
Serbia – Cyrillic (Serbian Cyrillic script)
Singapore
English, Malay — Latin script
Mandarin – Simplified Chinese
Tamil – Tamil script
Taiwan – Traditional Chinese 
Thailand – Thai script 
Turkey – Latin alphabet
Ukraine – Cyrillic (Ukrainian alphabet)
Vietnam – Latin script (de facto)

Historical 
 In the USSR, numerous languages were latinized during the 1920s–1930s. In the late 1930s the Latinization campaign was canceled and all newly romanized languages were converted to Cyrillic.

See also 
 Official language
 Spelling reform

References

Spelling reform
Spelling
Concepts in language policy